Renee Gartner is an entertainment personality, professional boxer, and television presenter from Australia, and daughter of rugby league player Russel Gartner. She was the media coordinator for the Australian Rugby League team The Gold Coast Titans. She fought as an amateur boxer in televised matches to raise funds for charity. She was an on-air panelist on the TV show SportsFan Clubhouse which aired on 7mate for three seasons from 2013 until 2015.  She currently works on the Channel 9 NRL Footy Show as a producer.

Boxing career

Professional boxing record

Personal life
In 2014 there were media reports that she was dating Australian rugby union player Quade Cooper.

References

External links

1984 births
Living people
Australian television presenters
Australian women boxers
Australian women television presenters
Boxers from Sydney
Renee
Sportspeople from the Gold Coast, Queensland
Sportswomen from Queensland